Desireé Cousteau is the stage name of a pornographic actress who made films in the 1970s and 1980s. She is best known for her roles in the 1978 film Pretty Peaches and 1979's Inside Désirée Cousteau. In 1993, she was inducted into the XRCO Hall of Fame, and in 1997, she was inducted into the AVN Hall of Fame.

Career
Cousteau aspired to be a mainstream model, but was told she was not tall enough or thin enough to succeed. After work modeling lingerie, she posed for Penthouse magazine. She tried making a career as a mainstream actress, landing a small part in the 1974 "women in prison" B-movie Caged Heat. After her career stalled and she grew tired of being sexually propositioned when auditioning for roles, she appeared in her first sex film when adult film director Alex de Renzy asked her to appear in Pretty Peaches.

She worked steadily in adult movies from the late 1970s through the early 1980s, often typecast in sweet, dizzy, naïve roles.

She received the Adult Film Association of America Best Actress Award in 1979 for her performance in the movie Pretty Peaches, with film director Alex de Renzy.

See also
 Golden Age of Porn

References

Further reading
  - includes a chapter on Cousteau.

External links
 
 
 

Living people
American pornographic film actresses
20th-century American actresses
1950s births
21st-century American women